The 1943 Buckingham by-election was a parliamentary by-election held on 4 August 1943 for the House of Commons constituency of Buckingham in Buckinghamshire.

The by-election was held to fill the vacancy caused when the town's 45-year-old Conservative Party Member of Parliament Brigadier John Whiteley was killed in a plane crash in Gibraltar, along with another Conservative member, Victor Cazalet, and General Sikorski, the leader of the Polish government-in-exile. Whiteley had held the seat since a by-election in 1937.

Candidates
The Conservative Party nominated as its candidate, Lionel Berry, the deputy chairman of Kemsley Newspapers Ltd (owner of The Sunday Times and the Daily Record), and eldest son of the company's proprietor, Viscount Kemsley.

In accordance with an electoral truce between the parties in the wartime coalition government, neither the Liberal nor Labour parties nominated a candidate.

Result
As the only candidate, Berry was returned unopposed.  

He held the seat for only two years, until his defeat at the 1945 general election.

See also
 Lists of United Kingdom by-elections
 Buckingham constituency
 1937 Buckingham by-election

References

1943 elections in the United Kingdom
1943 in England
20th century in Buckinghamshire
Unopposed by-elections to the Parliament of the United Kingdom in English constituencies
By-elections to the Parliament of the United Kingdom in Buckinghamshire constituencies
Buckingham
April 1943 events